Terrence Edward "Terry" Smith (born 26 November 1946) was a Labor Party member of Australia's Northern Territory Legislative Assembly, representing Millner. A member of the Labor Party, he was elected to the Assembly on 21 November 1980, following the resignation of Jon Isaacs on 2 November.  He resigned on 21 November 1991, and was succeeded by Ken Parish.

|}

He served as the leader of the opposition from 19 August 1986 until October 1990

References

Members of the Northern Territory Legislative Assembly
1946 births
Living people
Leaders of the Opposition in the Northern Territory
Australian Labor Party members of the Northern Territory Legislative Assembly